Liu Yong (1719–1805) was a Chinese politician and calligrapher of the Qing dynasty.

Biography

Liu Yong was born in Shandong 1719 with courtesy name Chong Ru, pen name Shi An, nick name Prime Minister Hunchback Liu or Hunchback Liu.

He served in a number of high-level positions with a reputation for being incorruptible, including as the Minister of Rites and Minister of War, and is regarded by some as the "most influential calligrapher of his time".

References 

1719 births
1804 deaths
Qing dynasty calligraphers
Qing dynasty politicians from Shandong
Politicians from Weifang
Political office-holders in Jiangsu
Artists from Shandong
Grand Secretaries of the Qing dynasty
Assistant Grand Secretaries
Viceroys of Zhili